Charles Frederick Rauber (20 September 1890 – 9 March 1966) was an Australian rules footballer who played with Carlton in the Victorian Football League (VFL).

Notes

External links 

Charles Rauber's profile at Blueseum

1890 births
1966 deaths
Australian rules footballers from Melbourne
Carlton Football Club players
People from Brunswick, Victoria